Rajakaruna Navaratne Atapattu Mudiyanselage Wijeratne Banda Warakagoda (Born 21 November 1933; as ), popularly as Wijeratne Warakagoda, is  an actor in Sri Lankan cinema, stage drama and television.. Career spanning more than six decades, Warakagoda is also a singer and a voice artist in Radio Ceylon. He is best known for the role "Korale Mahaththaya" in radio sitcom Muwan Palessa.

Personal life
Wijeratne Warakagoda was born on 21 November 1933, in a small village in Kurunegala although his father's ancestry home town was Warakagoda in Harispattuwa, Kandy. His father Madduma Bandara was a police sergeant by profession. His mother was Basnayake Mudiyanselage Ran Menika, a housewife. His maternal grandfather was a Korale chief. Since his father worked for the police, he went to seven schools. 

He studied at St. Anne’s College Kurunegala for nine years and ended up at Ananda College, Colombo. During school times, he was excellent in sports such as 5000m, 800m as well as for singing. 

After school life, he first worked as junior clerk in a Kurunegala bank. Meanwhile, he applied for the government clerk exam and became the second from Sri Lanka. The month after the results, he got the job in the Kachcheriya. After few years of working, he applied for the Sri Lanka Police Service and became a Police Inspector in June 1956 after doing a written examination in Kandy and going to the Katukuranda Police Training College, Kalutara. After training, he was first appointed in Pettah Police and later to the Fort police. From there he was sent to the Police Transport Division for training. He served it for eight years as a Sub Inspector in crime division while he continued acting on stage. He is one of the active inspectors at the hospital when Prime Minister S. W. R. D. Bandaranaike was shot and taken to the hospital.

In 1970, Warakagoda married Chithra Iranganie Jayasinghe, who was also a co-actor in Henry Jayasena's stage play Kuveni. The wedding was celebrated on 28 January 1970 at Hotel Taprobane. They had a son and a daughter; Vindya, born in 1972 is a dancer and Jananath born in 1977, is a musician, singer and a dancer.

Career
In 1960 Warakagoda was selected as an A-Grade singer in Radio Ceylon. First he sang the song Yanawada Maa Dama Sundari by Sisira Senaratne. In, 1962, film director Robin Tampoe invited Warakagoda for his film Suhada Divi Piduma, which marked his cinema career. Then, he acted in few Tampoe's films such as Samaje Api Okkoma Samanai and Sudu Sande Kali Wala.

In 1963, he acted in his first stage drama in Ajasaththa produced by Wimal Nawagamuwa. For his role as "Old King Bimbisara", he won the best actor award in the style section at Drama competition. Then Henry Jayasena invited him to play the role of "Puraka" in the drama Kuveni. He continued to act in many plays produced by Jayasena, such as Apata Puthe Magak Nathe, Mana Ranjana Wada Warjana, Hunuwataye Kathawa and Diriya Mawa Saha Aege Daruwo. 

In 1964, Ediriweera Sarachchandra invited him to play the role of "Puraka" in the critically acclaimed stage play Maname. His relationship with Warakagoda Prof. Sarachchandra continued to grow, where Warakagoda acted his stage plays including, Sinhabahu, Prematho Jayathi Soko, Kapuwa Kapothi Mahasara and Lomahansa. He then played as "Jasaya" in the stage play Jasaya Lenchina produced by his classmate Dayananda Gunawardena.  He later won Governor's Award for Best Stylized Actor at the 1963 State Drama Festival.

He moved to radio drama as a voice artist for the radio drama Muwan Pelessa one of the longest running radio dramas in the recorded history of Sri Lankan radio. He played the roles of John Mcwood, Arachchila and Korale, who became the only actor to have acted in 2700 episodes of a radio drama in the history. With that drma, Warakagoda became the only artist who has played a single role in the radio drama for over 55 years. Since Muwan Pelessa was only launched in late 1963, the SLBC has no record of it, and the only evidence to show that it was begun on March 12, 1964, was a photo of its founder Dr. Somaratne. The character started as "Arachchila" but later changed to "Korale" when Mudalinayaka moved to US when the JVP started its turmoil on April 5, 1971. During his peak time in acting career, Warakagoda went Saudi Arabia in 1982 to earn money. After return to Sri Lanka, he acted in the play Maha Giri Daba produced by Jayalath Manoratne. He also worked as Chief Security Officer of the Oruwala Steel Corporation for few years.

Warakagoda served as the Deputy Director General on the Tower Hall Theatre Foundation until 1990. In 2019, he was honored with Janabhimani Honorary Award at the Bandaranaike Memorial International Conference Hall.

Theater works 

Apata Puthe Magak Nathe
Ajasaththa
Arunata Pera
Hora Police
Hunuwataye Kathawa
Kuveni
Maname
Manaranjana Wedawarjana
Mandela Mandela 
Sinhabahu
Suhada Divi Piduma

Television serials

 Alli and Galli 
Amarapuraya
 Anne 
 Chakraangee
 Dese Disnaya
 Haye Pahara
 Indrachapa 
 Jeewithaya Lassanai
 Katu Kurullo 
 Kele Handa 
 Kinduru Adaviya
Korale Mahaththaya 
 Maada Eyama Wiya
 Mayaratne
 Mawathe Api 
 Monaravila 
 Pinkanda Simona 
 Punchi Weerayo
 Puja
 Raja Bhavana
 Rathriya
 Raththarana Neth
 Sagare Se Man Adarei
 Sakisanda Suwaris
 Sanda Ginigath Rathriya 
 Sathyaya 
 Shoba 
Sidangana 
 Situ Gedara
 Sive Diya Dahara 
 Snehaye Daasi
 Sooriya Daruwo
 Sooriya Nayo
 Suddilage Kathawa 
 Sujatha
 Sulang Kapolla 
 Suwanda Obai Amme
 Three-wheel Malli 
 Tikiri and Ungi 
 Varanaya
 Wara Peraliya 
 Yaddehi Gedara
 Yes Boss

Filmography
 No. denotes the Number of Sri Lankan film in the Sri Lankan cinema.

Awards
 Sarasaviya Awards - Merit Award for performance in Golu Hadawatha - 1969
 President’s Merit Award for performance in Kele Mal - 1984
 OCIC and President’s Best Actor Award for performance in Arunata Pera - 1985
 Raigam Tele'es Prathibha Prabha Award - 2018

Songs
Although he doesn't sing often, some of his songs have been written into the hearts of many music lovers in Sri Lanka. Below are some of his most famous songs.
 Rangahala dan atha ada andure (රඟහල දැන් ඇත අඩ අඳුරේ)
 Hiru Payanawa / Manike hinahenawa (හිරු පායනවා)
 Mihiri Sihinayaka Dewatunu (මිහිරි සිහිනයක දැවටුනු)
 Yannem Dakna (යන්නම් දක්නා ඒ ලාලනී)
 Sihale Mal (සිහලේ මල්)
 Atharaman Wela Ma (අතරමන් වෙලා මා) - (Duet)
 Wandanawe Yamu (වන්දනාවේ යමු පේවීලා)
 Pama Wela Wahapan (පමා වෙලා වහපන් වැහි වලාවේ)

References

1933 births
Living people
Sri Lankan male film actors
Sinhalese male actors
Sri Lankan Buddhists
20th-century Sri Lankan male singers
Alumni of St. Anne's College, Kurunegala